Aglae is a genus of euglossine bees, with the only described species Aglae caerulea. Like all orchid bees, it is restricted to the Neotropics. They are metallic blue. This species, like the genus Exaerete, is a nest parasite on free-living Euglossini. A. caerulea lays its eggs in the nests of Eulaema nigrita, and possibly other Eulaema species.

Among other substances, males of this species are attracted by methyl cinnamate baits.

Name
The Ancient Greek, Αγλαιη means "beauty". The original 1825 publication describing the species spelled the epithet as "cœrulea" (for "blue"), which nearly all subsequent authors misspelled as caerulea rather than coerulea, but under Article 33.3.1 of the ICZN, the caerulea spelling must be maintained.

Distribution
A. caerulea was thought to occur only in the Amazon basin, in the rainforests of northern Bolivia, western Colombia, Ecuador, French Guiana, Guyana, Peru, Venezuela, Suriname, and Panama. However, the record from Panama is doubtful. Recent studies have extended the range by about 2,400 km southwards, when specimens were found in the National Park Chapada dos Guimarães, Mato Grosso, Brazil.

References

  (1983): Orchid floral fragrances and male euglossine bees: methods and advances in the last sesquidecade. Biol. Bull. 164: 355–395.

Notes

Further reading
  (2004): Phylogeny and Biology of Neotropical Orchid Bees (Euglossini). Annual Review of Entomology 49: 377–404.

External links
 David Roubik (Smithsonian Tropical Research Institute): Diagnostic photographs of Aglae caerulea

Euglossini
Monotypic bee genera
Hymenoptera of South America
Insects of Brazil
Fauna of the Amazon
Orchid pollinators